Darren Young (born 1983) is an American professional wrestler.

Darren Young may also refer to:

 Darren Young (Scottish footballer) (born 1978), Scottish football player
 Darren Young (New Zealand footballer) (born 1981), New Zealand football defender
 Darren Young (New Jersey) in United States House of Representatives elections, 2006
 Darren Young (actor) from Storylines of Shortland Street (1995)
 Darren Young (athlete) in 2012 CARIFTA Games
 Darren Young (cyclist) in 2003 UCI Track Cycling World Cup Classics
 Darren Young (hurler) in Kerry Minor Hurling Team 2001

See also
 Darin Young (born 1973), American darts player